The Diocese of Riverina is one of 23 dioceses of the Anglican Church of Australia. The diocese covers 37% of New South Wales, including the Riverina and the far west of the state. The diocese was established in 1884 when the Diocese of Goulburn was divided.

Parishes and ministry 
The diocese has 23 parishes and covers main population centres of Griffith, Broken Hill, Deniliquin, Leeton, Narrandera and Corowa.

However, only 15 of the parishes have full-time clergy. In 2003 funding pressures lead the diocese to a joint funding arrangement with the Diocese of Canberra and Goulburn and the Diocese of Bathurst for several ministry services.

List of diocesan bishops

Cathedral 

St Alban's Cathedral in Griffith is the cathedral of the diocese. Initial ground work for the cathedral building begun as early as 1937, but substantive construction was not until 1954 and the foundation stone being laid in 1954. However, the building did not actually become the cathedral until 1984 as part of the diocese's centenary celebrations.

The cathedral was invested in honour of the World War II fallen and in 1956 the Archbishop of Brisbane dedicated the cathedral's honour roll.

Parishes
St John's Anglican Church, Wentworth
Christ The King Anglican Church (Hillston)
St Peters Anglican Church (Leeton)

References

Further reading

External links
Diocese of Riverina official website
Diocese of Riverina Agency History
Portrait of Sydney Linton, first bishop of the Riverina

 
Riverina
1884 establishments in Australia
Anglican Church of Australia Ecclesiastical Province of New South Wales